Avtomobilçi Yevlax FK was an Azerbaijani football club from Yevlakh founded in 1990. They played in the Azerbaijan Top Division for only one season, 1992, before relegation to the Azerbaijan First Division. They dissolved three years later at the end of the 1994–95 season.

League and domestic cup history

References 

Football clubs in Azerbaijan
Association football clubs established in 1990
Defunct football clubs in Azerbaijan
Association football clubs disestablished in 1995